John Kelly Addy (born May 9, 1949) is an American politician in the state of Montana. He served in the Montana House of Representatives from 1983 to 1989. In 1989, he served as Speaker pro tempore of the House. He is a lawyer.

References

1949 births
Living people
Politicians from Helena, Montana
Georgetown University Law Center alumni
Montana State University alumni
Montana lawyers
Democratic Party members of the Montana House of Representatives